The China Railways SL2 (勝利2, Shènglì, "victory") class steam locomotive was a class of 4-6-2 passenger steam locomotives operated by the China Railway. They were originally built for the South Manchuria Railway (Mantetsu), where they were designated Pashini (パシニ) class.

History
Originally designated class G1, the Pashini class engines were built by Mantetsu's Shahekou Works in Dalian, based on the experience gained through the construction of the H4 (later Sorishi) class locomotives. A total of six were built between 1916 and 1921, with superheaters of the same time as was used in the rebuilding of the Pashii class, and the Pashini class were very similar to the previous class, though with larger cylinders.

The first three were built in 1916, by which time the operation of express passenger services was being reduced due to the First World War - they were discontinued entirely by 1918 - so the motivation for building them is uncertain. Another three were built in 1921, after express trains resumed operating in June of that year. On the main line (Dalian–Xinjing) they were being used on express and ordinary passenger trains, as well as mixed and goods trains, whilst on the Anfeng Line they were used on express and ordinary passenger trains and on mixed trains.

Postwar

All six were assigned to the Mudanjiang Railway Bureau at the end of the war, and were handed over to the Republic of China Railway. After the establishment of the People's Republic of China, they were classified class ㄆㄒ2 (PX2) by the China Railway in 1951, becoming class SL2 (勝利, Shènglì, "victory") in 1959.

References

4-6-2 locomotives
Shahekou Works locomotives
Railway locomotives introduced in 1916
Steam locomotives of China
Standard gauge locomotives of China
Rolling stock of Manchukuo
Passenger locomotives